Grigor III Pahlavuni (also Catholicos Grigor III Pahlavuni or Gregory III of Cilicia) (1093–1166) was the Catholicos of the Armenian Apostolic Church from 1113 to 1166. He is known for his sharakans, which are collections of hymns, and for the several lays he had written during his lifetime. The sharakans written by Pahlavuni typically have strong doctrinal influences and several relate to either the Feast of the Annunciation or Palm Sunday. Two of his better known sharakans are Khorhurdn anchar ("Ineffable Mystery) and Metsahrash ("Marvelous"). Pahlavuni earned the nickname “the younger lover of martyrs” because of his love for translating martyrologies from Greek and Latin to Armenian (called the "younger" to distinguish him from his great-uncle Catholicos Gregory II the Martyrophile). During his time as catholicos, Grigor III and Pope Innocent II occasionally had some correspondence with one another. Only one of the aforementioned letters has survived as an Armenian translation of a letter from Pope Innocent II to the catholicos.

Grigor III held office as catholicos for a little more than fifty years, and his younger brother Nerses assisted him greatly during this time. Pahlavuni was able to maintain peace within the Cilician Kingdom and the catholicosate during a time of instability due to raids from foreign invaders.  Because of these foreign invasions, Grigor III chose to seek refuge and moved the catholicosate two times: once in 1116 from Karmir Vank at Kesun to its new location in Tsovak, and again in 1149 to Hromgla. Nerses was elected co-catholicos in 1165.  After Grigor III retired from his position in office in 1166, Nerses, who would be later referred to as Nerses IV the Gracious (Shnorhali) or Saint Nerses the Graceful was elected unanimously to succeed him.

References

External links
 Armenian Legal History 
 Music in Ancient and Medieval Armenia

See also
Seats of the Catholicos of Armenians 
List of Catholicoi of Armenia
Catholicos of Cilicia

Grigor III Pahlavuni
Grigor III Pahlavuni
Armenian saints
Pahlavuni family
Grigor III Pahlavuni
12th-century Oriental Orthodox archbishops